X24 or X-24 may refer to:
 X24 (New York City bus), an express bus route between New Dorp Tysens Lane and Midtown Manhattan East 59 Street
 X24 engine, one of the few configurations of X-type aircraft engines known to have been produced
 , a British X-class submarine that sank the Laksevåg floating dock at Bergen on 11 September 1944
 Martin Marietta X-24, a "lifting body" experimental aircraft
 X-24 (comics) (aka Pantha), comic book character, a cat-like member of one of the incarnations of the Teen Titans
 X-24 (Logan), a character in the 2017 film Logan